John A. Carter (born May 3, 1963) is an American former professional ice hockey player who played for the Boston Bruins and San Jose Sharks of the National Hockey League.

Carter also represented the United States at the 1986 Ice Hockey World Championships.

Playing career
As a youth, Carter played in the 1976 Quebec International Pee-Wee Hockey Tournament with a minor ice hockey team from Assabet Valley.

Carter played four years with the Engineers at the Rensselaer Polytechnic Institute. During his four years, he was named an All-American and helped Rensselaer to win the 1985 NCAA Championships.

Undrafted out of Rensselaer Polytechnic Institute in 1986, Carter signed a three-year contract with the Boston Bruins.

Carter had a 10-year career jumping between the NHL and AHL. In a 1993 preseason game, he suffered a serious eye injury. After eight eye surgeries in the next few years, his eye finally had to be removed in 1996, leading to his retirement.

Personal life
Carter was born in Winchester, Massachusetts and raised in nearby Woburn.

In 1990, while playing for the Boston Bruins, Carter had a relationship with Joanne Presti, which resulted in a daughter, Alyssa, born in 1991. The couple was never married and Carter was not involved in his daughter's life – he said in 2004 that he had only met his daughter once. In January 2004, Joanne Presti and daughter Alyssa Presti were brutally murdered in their home in Woburn, Massachusetts. Joanne had also been raped. While Carter, being Alyssa's biological father, was questioned by police,  his voluntary DNA sample did not match DNA found at the scene.

Career statistics

Regular season and playoffs

Awards and honors

References

External links

John Carter Interview with Ron MacLean (1990) on YouTube

1963 births
Living people
American men's ice hockey left wingers
Boston Bruins players
Ice hockey players from Massachusetts
Kansas City Blades players
Maine Mariners players
Moncton Golden Flames players
People from Woburn, Massachusetts
Providence Bruins players
Rensselaer Polytechnic Institute alumni
RPI Engineers men's ice hockey players
San Jose Sharks players
Sportspeople from Middlesex County, Massachusetts
Undrafted National Hockey League players
Worcester IceCats players
NCAA men's ice hockey national champions
AHCA Division I men's ice hockey All-Americans